The 2007–08 Hartford Hawks men's basketball team  represented the University of Hartford during the 2007–08 NCAA Division I men's basketball season. The team was coached by second year coach Dan Leibovitz. The 2007–08 season was Hartford's most successful season in the division I era, finishing second in the regular season and reaching the conference championship finals. After the season assistant coach John Gallagher would leave Hartford to take an assistant coaching position at Penn, he would return to Hartford in 2010 as head coach.

Roster

Schedule 

|-
!colspan=9 style=| Non-conference regular season

|-
!colspan=9 style=| America East regular season

|-
!colspan=12 style=| America East Men's tournament

References

Hartford Hawks men's basketball seasons
Hartford Hawks
Hartford
Hartford